Schizosaccharomyceta is a clade of fungi within Taphrinomycotina containing all members of the clade except Neolectomycetes and Taphrinomycetes  according to the 2007 fungal phylogeny "The Mycota: A Comprehensive Treatise on Fungi as Experimental Systems for Basic and Applied Research" and Tedersoo et al. 2018. Its members are single-celled and yeast-like and include Pneumocystis and Schizosaccharomycetes (fission yeasts) and Archaeorhizomycetes

See also 

 Ascomycota

References 

Ascomycota
Opisthokont unranked clades